Stefan Edberg was the defending champion, but lost in the third round to Jim Grabb.

Andre Agassi won the title by defeating Mikael Pernfors 6–4, 6–4, 7–5 in the final.

Seeds
All seeds received a bye to the second round.

Draw

Finals

Top half

Section 1

Section 2

Bottom half

Section 3

Section 4

References

External links
 Official results archive (ATP)
 Official results archive (ITF)

1988 Singles
1988 Grand Prix (tennis)